The Ave Maria Gyrenes are the athletic teams that represent Ave Maria University, located in Ave Maria, Florida, in intercollegiate sports as a member of the National Association of Intercollegiate Athletics (NAIA), primarily competing in the Sun Conference (formerly known as the Florida Sun Conference (FSC) until after the 2007–08 school year) since the 2009–10 academic year. They are also a member of the United States Collegiate Athletic Association (USCAA).

Varsity teams
Ave Maria competes in 24 intercollegiate varsity sports: Men's sports include baseball, basketball, cross country, football, golf, soccer, swimming, tennis, track & field (indoor and outdoor) and ultimate frisbee; basketball, beach volleyball, cross country, dance, golf, lacrosse, soccer, softball, swimming, tennis, track & field (indoor and outdoor) and volleyball. Former sports included men's & women's rugby.

Football
In 2011, Ave Maria became the first college in southwestern Florida to field a football team. In the spring of 2016, the Gyrenes football team joined the Mid-South Conference (MSC) as an affiliate member.

Lacrosse
The women's lacrosse team competed in the National Women's Lacrosse League (NWLL) in their first varsity season in the spring of 2015.

References

External links